Nagylengyel is a village in Zala County, Hungary.

Notable people
 Vanessa Axente (1995) Model

References

External links 
 Street map 

Populated places in Zala County